Siya Ke Ram ( Sita's Ram) is an Indian TV series on Star Plus produced by Nikhil Sinha under the banner of Triangle Film Company. This show presents the epic Ramayana, the story of Rama and Devi Sita from Sita's perspective. The show features Madirakshi Mundle and Ashish Sharma playing as Goddess Sita and Lord Rama, respectively, and Karthik Jayaram as Raavan. It premiered on 16 November 2015 and ended on 4 November 2016.

Plot

The main plot is taken from the Hindu epic Ramayana, which was written by Sage Valmiki, and Adbhuta Ramayan, and follows the story through Sita's perspective.

Baal Kand

Janak is the childless King of Mithila. While Mithila has suffered a drought for twelve years, elsewhere, Ram and his brothers are under the tutelage of Guru Vashista. Janak builds a golden plough and unearths a baby girl as he begins to plough. The baby's first cry leads to rainfall. Janak wants to find out whether or not the baby has a family. He is shocked to see the baby lift the Shiv Dhanush. Rishi Yagyavalkya suggests that Janak keep the baby and so he names her Sita.

It is shown that after eight years, Sita and her sisters are playing the act of Goddess Durga, who destroyed a Rakshasa. Soon afterwards, Sita learns about Gautama Maharishi and the curse he gave to his wife Ahilya. Meanwhile, King Dasharatha is travelling to Guru Vashistha's ashram to see his sons and gets inspired by Ram. Ram comes to his kingdom and meets his mother. Meanwhile, he learns that he has an elder sister called Shanta.

Later, it is shown that both Ram and Sita have grown up. In Ayodhya, King Dasharatha conducts the Ashwamedha Yajna for the well-being of his sons and his kingdom. While travelling towards Mithila, Sita dares to stop the ceremonial horse and comforts it. After coming back, Ram tells not to kill the horse but spare its life.

Guru Vishvamitra takes Ram and Lakshman from Ayodhya to destroy the demoness queen Tataka. Sita and her sisters also travel along with Kushadhwaja to see Guru Vishvamitra. They give Lakshman some food. Soon Taraka and her son Subahu are killed by Ram and Lakshman. Guru Vishvamitra tells him that he wants to take both of them to Mithila and seek the blessings of Shiv Dhanush. While travelling to Mithila, he sees Rishi Gautam and Ahilya's ashram and cures her curse. Gautam Rishi seeks his greatness to Ram. Meanwhile, Sita learns about her birth. Sita falls in love with Ram without seeing him. Ram comes to Mithila, and they meet for the first time at the Parvati temple. Soon after, Sita's Swayamvar is announced. Lanka king Ravana's grandfather and minister Malyavan travels to Mithila to see the greatness of the kingdom and argues with Sita. Then he informs Ravana that Tataka is killed.

In the Swayamvara, nobody can lift the Shiv Dhanush except Ram. Ram's marriage is fixed with Sita. Urmila and Lakshman argue upon the topic of food. On the other hand, Ravan is angry that he was unable to lift the Shiv Dhanush, and Janak has insulted him. So he vows to avenge the king. Afterwards, Ravan learns that he will die because of a woman. Ravan remembers the day he tried to force himself upon a chaste woman, Vedavati. She had then cursed him that the cause of his death will be a woman. Remembering this, Ravan goes to Yamlok, the abode of Yama, in the hope that if he keeps Yama under his thumb, he can elude death. However, Goddess of Death Mrityu Devi appears, and a terrible fight ensues between her and Ravan. Ravan soon gets overpowered. Ram and Sita get married along with Ram's brothers and Sita's sisters. However at first Mandavi rejects Bharat as, during their first meet, he had accidentally spilt her plate of Haldi and Kumkum on her. (Lakshman-Urmila, Bharat-Mandavi, Shatrughna-Shrutakirti).

Meanwhile, in Lanka, Mandodri gets worried about the death of Ravan and decides to seek help from a Vishnu devotee. Mithila bids farewell to Sita and her sisters.

Ayodhya Kand

Mandodari tells her father Mayasura that Ravan's life is in danger, but he refuses to help. According to the series, she had left with Ravan against her parents' wishes after forced marriage (Gandharava Vivah) by Ravan. Her mother, however, guides her in getting the Amrita. Mandodari goes to Chandralok to get the Amrita. Vibhishana warns Mandodari that Ravan should not find out about his immortality. Mandodari succeeds to an extent in her plan of making Ravan immortal. Elsewhere Ram, Lakshman, Bharat, and Shatrughna reach Ayodhya with their brides. Kaushalya, Kaikeyi, and Sumitra welcome them. An Aghori predicts Manthara's future and tells her that she will be thrown out of the palace. Ravan challenges the gods to stop him from conquering the world. Ravan confronts Surpanakha for marrying a demon, Vidyutjiva, who is Raavan's enemy. Meanwhile, Bharat and Shatrughan set off to meet Ashwapati, their grandfather.

Dasharath announces Ram to be his heir to the throne. Kaushalya, Sumitra, and Lakshman are ecstatic to know that Ram will be crowned the king of Ayodhya. Manthara is determined to stop Ram from becoming the king. She reminds Kaikeyi about Dasharath's promise to Ashwapati and feeds that Dasharath is conspiring against her. Kaikeyi decides to stop Ram's coronation. Kaikeyi reminds Dasharath about the promises that he had given her. He vows to fulfil two wishes. Kaikeyi tells him to crown Bharat as the king of Ayodhya and send Ram into exile for 14 years.

Dasharath hesitantly agrees to crown Bharat, the king, and send Ram away. Sita urges Ram to take her along with him. Urmila supports Lakshman's decision of accompanying Ram. Ram leaves Ayodhya in his exile with Sita and Lakshman. Bharat and Shatrughna receive a message asking them to return to Ayodhya. A grieving Dasharatha passes away and Sumitra blames Kaikeyi for his death. Bharat asks Mandavi and Vashistha about Ram. When he learns about Kaikeyi's misdeed, he blames her for Dashrath's death. He confronts her for her actions against Ram. Bharata refuses to become the king of Ayodhya. Bharat and Janak decide to bring Ram back to Ayodhya. Kaikeyi is grateful to Janak for reminding her about her love for Ram. She requests Bharat to take her along with him to meet Ram.

Ram meets Bharat and is depressed about learning about Dasharath's death. Bharat requests Ram to return to Ayodhya, but he refuses. He tells Janak that he will not return because he wants to fulfil the promise he had made to Dasharath. Bharat asks Ram for his sandals. Bharat places Ram's sandals on the throne. He apologizes to Vashisht, saying he cannot take over Ram's place. Shatrughna confronts Bharata for his decision to become a tapas. Bharat assures Kaushalya that he will stay near Ayodhya. He asks Shatrughna to help him in keeping his promise to Ram to take care of Ayodhya. Lakshman tells Ram and Sita that Goddess Nidradevi has given him a boon to stay awake so that he can serve them. At Lakshman's request, Nidradevi gives his share of sleep to Urmila, until he returns to Ayodhya.

Aranya Kand

Ram conveys to Sita about his wish to protect the Rishis and people from the demons. They complete ten years of their exile. Sugriva tells Hanuman about Rumā. Hanuman conveys to Rumā that Sugriva loves her and wants to marry her. Bali decides to get Sugriva married to Rumā. Ravan decides to send Khar and Dushan to take control of Dandakaranya. Surpanakha insists Ravan to let her go to Dandakaranya. Malyavan shares his plan to take over Kishkindha with Meghanad. Dundubi comes up with a plan to kill Bali and Sugriva. Dundubi disguises as a buffalo and battles with Bali. Bali kills Dundubi. Rishi Matang curses Bali for breaking his meditation. Ram kills Ravan's soldiers and saves the residents of Panchvati. Surpanakha falls in love with Ram.

Mayavi decides to take Bali to the Rishimukh mountain. Bali follows Mayavi into a cave and asks Sugriva to wait outside until he returns. However, Sugriva is shocked at hearing Bali's screams. He closes the mouth of the cave with a big stone as he assumes that Bali was killed by Mayavi. Sugriva suggests that Tara makes Angad, the king of Kishkindha.

Shurpanakha urges Ram to marry her, but he tells her that he is already married. Shurpanakha plans to prove herself better than Sita. Ram gets irate when Shurpanakha comes to him dressed like Sita. She attacks Sita. Lakshmana cuts Shurpanakha's nose. Surpanakha asks Khara to kill Ram, Sita, and Lakshman. Khara attacks Ram with his asuras. Ram kills Khara and Dushan by using his powers. Shurpanakha reaches Lanka, tells everyone about the attack. Surpanakha asks Ravan to avenge her insult by Ram. Ravan decides to punish Ram for his deeds. Sugriva's coronation ceremony begins. Hanuman crowns Sugriva as the king of Kishkindha. A furious Bali returns to Kishkindha and attacks Sugriva for locking him up in the cave. Hanuman rescues Sugriva from Bali. Ravan gets information about Ram and learns that Sita is Ram's weakness. He also remembers the incident at Sita's swayamvar and his oath to take revenge from Janak. Ravan decides to abduct Sita. Ravan tells Marich about Surpanakha's humiliation and seeks his help to avenge her insult. Hanuman takes Sugriva to Rishimukh mountain.

Marich disguises himself as an injured golden deer to distract Ram from Sita and leads him far into the forest. Sita sees the injured golden deer and tells Ram that she wants to cure it. Ram tells Lakshman to stay with Sita while he goes to bring the deer. Meanwhile, Hanuman tells Sugriva that Bali has made Rumā his slave. Hanuman tells Sugriva that he will seek help from the other kings to defeat Bali. However, Ram is shocked when Marich calls out to Sita and Lakshman in his voice. Sita is worried about hearing Ram's cries. Marich apologizes to Ram for his misdeed and dies. Sita orders Lakshman to go into the jungle to look for Ram. Lakshman hesitantly agrees and draws a powerful line Lakshmana Rekha which no immoral creature could cross to protect Sita, but tells Sita not to cross it or the power would go. Lakshman leaves. Ravan disguises as a sage and tricks Sita to cross the Lakshmana Rekha line. Sita tries to run, but he ends up abducting her.

On the way to Lanka, Jatayu tries to save Sita, but Ravan cuts off both his wings. Sita then throws her jewellery to the ground hoping Ram will see it as a sign. Sita tells Ravan to kill her and avenge himself. Ravan kidnaps Sita and takes her to Lanka. Surpanakha is delighted to see Sita in Lanka. Later, Ravan stops Surpanakha from attacking Sita. He tells her to keep Sita alive until he avenges her insult.

Ravan's mother Kaikesi, tells him that he should marry Sita as she is a powerful woman instead of treating her badly. Sita finds her place in the garden of Lanka (Ashoka Vatika) and refuses Ravan's proposal saying that she is always going to love Ram and never be unfaithful to him. She decides to wait for him until her death. Meanwhile, Ram learns about the abduction from the bird Jatayu.

Kishkindh Kand

Hanuman meets Ram and becomes his devotee. He narrates about Sugriva's problem and his brother Bali misbehaving with his wife, Rumā. Ram challenges to kill Bali and liberate him from all his sins. He directs Sugriv to go on a duel with Bali so that he can kill him during that time. Everything happens accordingly, and Ram kills Bali. Bali regrets his mistakes and dies. Sugriva is crowned the king of Kishkindha. Bali's son Angad begins to follow Ram and joins the monkey army. Sugriva and Ram instruct Hanuman to enquire about Sita and her well-being. He also gives him his ring as a mark of his well-being to Sita.

Sundar Kand

Hanuman goes to Lanka and meets Sita. He also gives her Ram's ring. Sita gets shocked when she learns about Ram's condition. Ravan instructs his second son Akshayakumara to attack Hanuman. Mandodari knows about Hanuman's strength and fears because she doesn't want to lose her son. Instead, she wants Akshayakumara to leave Lanka. Akshay heads his father's words and attempts to attack Hanuman. Hanuman, with his wit and power, kills Akshayakumara. Soldiers bring his dead body to the king. All get shocked to see this, and Mandodari gets shattered to see her deceased son. Hanuman is brought to the king by the soldiers, and Ravan decides to punish Hanuman by sentencing him to death. But Vibhishan advises to mutilate one of his body parts rather than killing him. Ravan chooses to burn his tail. All the men and Meghnadh burn the rear. Sita learns about this and prays to Agni Dev to produce coolness instead of a burning sensation to Hanuman. Hanuman burns the whole unethical Lanka with his tail. Sita gives her chudamani (head ornament) to Hanuman as a mark of her presence in Lanka. Hanuman leaves Lanka.

Vibhishan pleads with his brother Ravan to free Sita and handover her to Ram as she is someone's wife. Ravan kicks Vibhishan and considers him as his enemy. He throws him out of Lanka. Hanuman reaches Ram and tells about Sita being in Ashok Vatika. Ram vows to free Sita from Ravan's captivity and kill him.

Ram, Lakshman, and the whole monkey army decide to construct a sea bridge (Ram Setu) across the ocean to Lanka. Two other monkeys, Nal and Neel, join the monkey army. Ram prays to Lord Shiva before constructing the bridge. Ram, along with the monkey army, constructs the bridge and goes to Lanka. Vibhishan joins Ram's army and tells them that he will help them in the war.

Yuddh Kand

Ram, Lakshman, and the monkey army reach Lanka, and Ram declares war against Ravan. Ravan plans troops to attack the monkey army at midnight. Ravan's army attacks the monkey army as per plan. Meghnadh plans to kill Ram and Lakshman. With his illusion, he shoots an invisible venomous arrow at Ram and Lakshman. They become unconscious. There was no way to cure them because it is a potent poison. Ravan becomes happy that his son Meghnadh has killed Ram and Lakshman. Sita feels shattered when she hears that Ram has died. Lord Shiva then decides to request the King of birds, Lord Garuda (Lord Vishnu's vehicle, and thus Lord Ram's as well) to save Ram and Lakshman, which he does.

Ram then kills many more warriors in the war, including Ravan's younger brother Kumbhakarna. This gravely angers Ravan, and he decides to kill Ram as soon as possible. After that, he sends Meghanad (his son) to fight Ram-Lakshman. He goes to the battlefield and fights Lakshman. He uses Shakti on Lakshman, and Lakshman goes into an unconscious state. Trijata tells Ram's army the address of Sushena. Hanuman flies to the house of Sushena. Sushena tells the only option to save Lakshman is Sanjeevani Booti. Hanuman flies to the Himalayas to get Sanjeevani. After he returns, a Lepa of Sanjeevani is drunk by Lakshman, which brings him back to life. While in Lanka, Meghnad does the Devi Yagya to get Divine Weapons and Divine Horsecart. The disadvantage of this Yagya was that if the Yagya is stopped in between, then the person doing it gets killed. The vanar sena disturbs Meghnad. Lakshman chops off the head of Meghanad. After this, Raavan enters the battlefield. Ram gets hurt, and Ravana nearly strangles him to death. Each time he attacks Ravan, he gets back. Vibhishana tells the secret of Ravan to Ram that he had nectar in his navel. Ram then shots the arrows at Ravan's navel. Ravan dies. But After he dies, his mother creates his elder and more powerful brother, Sahastra Ravan. Now Ram thinks that since he was able to kill Ravan once he can kill him once again. He starts shooting arrows at Sahastra Ravan. But nothing happens to Sahastra Ravan, he single-handedly defeats them all. Kaikesi informs this to Sita and she rushes to the battlefield. In a fit of rage, she transforms herself into Kali and kills Sahastra Ravan.

Uttar Kand

After being crowned king, Ram spends life pleasantly with Sita and Forwards their Marriage with Love . While Sita gets pregnant with Ram's Child .  Rumours about Sita's purity spread among the populace of Ayodhya. Ram banishes Sita to the forest due to the rumours. A dejected Sita beseeches her mother, Goddess Bhumi, to give her advice and aid her in her time of need. A furious Bhumi decides to destroy Ayodhya and the clan of Raghu as punishment for Sita's undeserving plight. Sita requests her mother not to destroy them and promises her that the day she has completely fulfilled all her duties, she would seek refuge from her and return to her. Later, Sage Valmiki provides shelter to Sita in his hermitage, where she gives birth to Ram's twin boys Lava and Kusha. Sita raises them as a single mother but incognito under the name of Vanadevi. After 12 years, Ram decides to perform the Ashwamedha Yagna, and the twins catch the horse of the Yagna after which a terrible battle ensues. After defeating Lakshman, Bharata, and Shatrughna as well as Hanuman, the twins are about to battle with their father, but Sita stops them and requests Ram to forgive them. She then reveals to the twins that Ram is their father, and they realize that their mother is the very Sita herself who they fought for, to give her justice.

Ram decides to bring Sita back and asks the people of Ayodhya if he could do so. He proceeds with the entire family to bring Sita back, and there Luva and Kusha are united with Ram. Sita refuses to return to Ayodhya as it was that society who doubted her character, and she cannot return to it as it would be wrong on her part and betray all those other women who have suffered the same plight as her. As a final testament to her purity . Sita returns to her celestial abode by going back to her mother, Bhumi, after confronting Ram. Ram is left heartbroken at this and returns to Ayodhya. He then promotes woman rights on Sita's behalf. After some years, Ram crowns Luva and Kusha as Kings of Ayodhya and along with his brothers - Bharat and Shatrughan drown themselves in the Sarayu river. Lakshman precedes his brothers, being the incarnation of Sheshnaag.

At the bottom of the river, Ram turns to Vishnu. Shatrughan transforms into the conch shell Panchajanya and Bharat to the Sudarshan Chakra of Vishnu's. They return to Vishnu, and Vishnu sees Lakshmi coming towards him, telling him that he took a long time to join her and then said that they should return to their abode. Meanwhile, Hanuman says to the populace of Ayodhya that Ram and Sita live forever in them all, and he tears open his chest to show that Ram and Sita were always in his heart.

Cast

Main
 Madirakshi Mundle as Sita: Goddess of Beauty; Goddess Lakshmi's incarnation; Janak and Sunaina's adopted and eldest daughter; Bhumi Devi's real daughter; Urmila's elder sister; Mandavi and Shrutakirti's elder cousin; Vedavati's reincarnation; Ram's wife; Luv and Kush's mother.
 Ananya Agarwal as young Sita.
 Ashish Sharma as Ram: Lord Vishnu's 7th incarnation; Dasharatha and Kaushlya's son; Shanta's younger brother; Sita's husband; Luv and Kush's father; Kaikeyi and Sumitra's stepson, Lakshman, Bharat and Shatrughan's elder brother.
 Yash Mistry as young Rama
 Vedant Sawant as teenage Rama
 Karthik Jayaram as Ravana: Vishrava and Kaikesi's son; Kumbhakaran & Vibhishan, and Surpanakha's brother; Jay's reborn.
 Uzair Basar as Lava: Ram And Sita's elder son.
 Harsha Sharma as Kusha: Ram and Sita's younger son.
 Karan Suchak as Lakshman: Sheshnag's incarnation; Dasharatha and Sumitra's first son; Urmila's husband; Shatrughna's twin brother; Angada and Chandraketu's father; slayer of Indrajit; Ram and Bharat's younger brother.
 Samarth Mishra as teenage Lakshmana
 Yukti Kapoor as Urmila: Janak and Sunaina's youngest daughter; Nagalakshmi incarnation; Sita's younger sister; Mandavi's younger and Shrutakirti's elder cousin; Lakshmana's wife; Angada and Chandraketu's mother.
 Danish Akhtar Saifi as Hanuman: Lord Shiva's 11th incarnation; Ram's devotee; The son of Vayu dev; Kesari and Anjana's son.

Recurring

Ayodhya
 Dalip Tahil as Dasharatha: King Aja and Queen Indumati's son; Kausalya, Kaikeyi, and Sumitra's husband; Shanta, Ram, Bharat, Laxman and Shatrughan's father; Sage Hrishyashringa's father-in-law.
 Snigdha Akolkar as Kaushalya: Dasharatha's first wife; Shanta and Ram's mother; Bharat, Lakshman and Shatrughan's step-mother.
 Grusha Kapoor as Kaikeyi: Dasharatha's second wife; Bharat's mother; Ram, Lakshman and Shatrughan's step-mother.
 Sampada Vaze as Sumitra: Dasharatha's third wife; Laxmana and Shatrughan's mother; Ram and Bharat's step-mother.
 Zalak Desai as Shanta: Dasharatha and Kaushalya's daughter; Ram's elder sister, Bharat, Lakshman and Shatrughan's step-elder sister, Rishi Hrishyayashringa's wife
 Sujay Reu as Bharata: Lord Vishnu's Shankha's incarnation; Dasharatha and Kaikeyi's son; Mandavi's husband; Taksha and Pushkala's father; Ram, Lakshman and Shatrughan's brother
 Vedant Sawant as teenage Rama
 Pravisht Mishra as teenage Bharata 
 Prithvi Hatte as Mandavi: Goddess Lakshmi's flower avatar; Kushadhwaja and Chandrabhaga's eldest daughter; Sita and Urmila's cousin; Shrutakirti's elder sister;Bharat's wife; Taksha and Pushkala's mother.
 Pratham Kunwar as Shatrughna: Lord Vishnu's Sudarshana Chakra's incarnation; Ram,  Bharat and Lakshman's youngest brother; Dasratha and Sumitra's second son; Shrutakirti's husband; Shatrughati and Subahu's father and the slayer of Lavanasur
 Sharad Joshi as teenage Shatrughan.
 Tanvi Madhyan as Shrutakirti: Goddess Lakshmi's conch shell's incarnation; Sita and Urmila's cousin; Mandavi's younger sister; Kushadhwaja and Chandrabhaga's youngest daughter; Shatrughan's wife; Shatrughati and Subahu's mother.
 Sanyogeeta Bhave as Manthara: Kaikeyi's maid cum like her mother; Reason for Ram's vanvas.

Mithila
 Bijay Anand as Janak: Kushadhwaja's brother; Sunaina's husband; Sita and Urmila's father, King of Mithila.
 Bhargavi Chirmule as Sunaina: Janak's wife; Sita and Urmila's mother; Queen of Mithila
 Hemant Choudhary as Kushadhwaja: Janak's brother; Chandrabhaga's husband; Mandavi and Shrutakirti's father; King of Sankasya

 Anjali Rana as Chandrabhaga: Kushadhwaja's wife; Mandavi and Shrutakirti's mother, Queen of Sankasya
 Romanch Mehta as Shatananda: Ahilya and Sage Gautam's son
 Richa Soni as Gargi: sister of Gargacharya.
 Jitendra Trehan as Yagyavalkya
 Shweta Rastogi as Ahilya: Rishi Gautam's wife

Lanka
 Surendra Pal as Vishrava: Devbarnini and Kaikesi's husband; Kubera, Shaastra Ravana, Ravana, Kumbhakaran, Vibhishan, Khar, Dushan, and Surpanakha's father.
 Pratima Kazmi as Kaikesi: Vishrava's wife; Shaastra Ravana, Ravana, Kumbhakaran, Vibhishan, and Surpanakha's mother.
 Piyali Munshi as Mandodari: Ravan's first wife; Maya demon and Apsara Hema's daughter, Mayavi and Dundubhi's sister, Meghanaad, and Akshayakumara's mother.
 Ankur Nayyar as Meghanad: Ravan and Mandodari's first son; Sulochana's husband.
 Vividha Kirti as Sulochana-Meghanand's wife
 Nikhilesh Rathore as Akshayakumara: Ravan and Mandodari's second son; He is killed by Hanuman.
 Unknown as Prahasta-Ravan's Commander
 Gaurav Walia as Kumbhakarna/Vijay: Vishrava and Kaikesi's second son; Shaastra Ravana, Ravana, Vibhishan and Surpanakha brother; He is killed by Ram.
 Sailesh Gulabani as Vibhishan: Vishrava and Kaikesi's third son; Shaastra Ravana, Ravana, Kumbhakaran and Surpanakha's brother; King of Lanka.
 Sara Khan/Bhagyashree Mote as Surpanakha: Vishrava and Kaikesi's daughter; Shaastra Ravana Vidyutjihba's widow, Ravana, Kumbhakaran and Vibhishan's sister.
 Unknown as Kalanemi: He was send by Indrajit to stop Hanuman from going to the Himalayas but he gets killed by Hanuman; Maricha's son.
 Zahida Parveen as Trijata: Sita's caretaker in Lanka.
 Sumit Kaul as Akampana: Ravana's spy and maternal uncle; reason for Sita's abduction; he is killed by Lakshman and Hanuman.
 Pankaj Berry/Sanjay Swaraj as Mayasura: Hema's husband, Mandodari's father.
 Ajay Purkar as Malyavan: Ravan's maternal grandfather
 Devish Ahuja as Tarini: Ravan's son, a devotee of Lord Vishnu, he is killed by Lord Rama and attains moksha

Others
 Manish Wadhwa as Vishwamitra
siddhaye patel as associate director
 Chetanya Adib as Jatayu: He sacrifices his life by protecting Sita from Ravana.
 Sudesh Berry as Parashurama: Lord Vishnu's 6th incarnation.
 Priyanka Pal as Vedavati: Goddess Lakshmi's incarnation; daughter of King Kushadhwaj. she reincarnated as Sita. 
 Zubair Ali as Vali: Sugriva's brother; Tara's husband; Angad's father./Sugriva-Vali's brother; Ruma's husband.
 Jividha Sharma as  Tara: Vali's wife; Angad's mother.
 Deblina Chatterjee as Rumā: Sugriva's wife.
 Manav Sharma as Angad: Tara and Vali's son; Sugriva and Ruma's adopted son.
 Vishal_Bhardwaj_(actor) as Nalakūvara: also known as Nalakuber, who curses Ravana that if touches a woman against her wishes, his head would burst into a hundred pieces. Due to this curse, Ravana was never able to come in contact with Sita despite his ill intentions.
 Kashmera Shah as Tataka: a female asura killed by Ram.
 Shakti Singh as Valmiki
 Rohit Bakshi as Shiva: Parvati's consort; Kartikey, Ganesha and Ashokasundari's father.
 Rimpi Das as Parvati: Shiva's consort; Kartikey, Ganesha and Ashokasundari's mother.
 Anuya Bhagwat as Mrityudevi: Ravana fought with her.
 Sangeeta Khanayat as Ganga: She gives blessing to Sita and Rama.
 Raj Logani as Indra: Ravana and Indrajit defeated him and he helped Rama against Ravana.
 Radha Krishna Dutt as Brahma: Ravana asked boon to him that only human can kill him.
 Shailesh Datar as Narad: Brahma's son.
 Vinod Kapoor as Sumantra
 Rahul Rana as Subahu
 Abhijit Lahiri as Bharadwaj
 Arup Pal as Ashwapati
 Amit Dhawan as Yudhajeet
 Abhilash Chaudhary as Ketu
 Sanjeev Siddharth as Yama

Special episodes

 Aa Rahe Hain Shree Ram - aired on 14 December 2015

It shows the Birthday of Rama after 8 years leap. From this episode Ashish Sharma plays the role of adult Rama, before this role of teenage Rama was played by Vedant Sawant.

 Swayamvar Saptaah - aired from 18 to 23 January 2016
It shows the Swayamvar of Sita organized by her father Janak.
Sita will marry with the man who could string the Shiv Dhanush by lifting it as easily as she did. Rama, on the day of Swayamvar, lifted the bow effortlessly and won Sita's hand in marriage.

 Vivah Utsav - aired from 3 to 13 February 2016
Vivah Utsav of Rama and Sita Starts with Haldi Ceremony. On the occasion of Deep Milan Utasv King Dasharatha fixed the marriage of his other Children with the other daughters of Janak and Kushadhwaja.
Bharata weds with Mandavi, Lakshmana weds with Urmila and Shatrughan weds with Shrutakirti.
This Vivah Utsav ends with the Vidai Ceremony.

Production

Casting
Simone Singh was initially roped for the role of Kaikayi but was replaced by Khalida Turi. As the makers felt her too young for the role, they replaced her with Grusha Kapoor.

Ashish Sharma was roped for playing Lord Ram and Madirakshi Mundle was roped for Lady Sita who makes her Hindi television debut. Dalip Tahil was roped for playing Ram's father Dasharath. Bijay Anand was cast as Sita's father Janak who returned to acting after 17 years. Rohit Bakshi was cast for playing Lord Shiva. Karan Suchak and Yukti Kapoor were roped for playing Lord Lakshman and Lady Urmila, Lakshman's wife. Wrestler Danish Akhtar was selected for portraying Hanuman thereby making his acting debut. Chetanya Adib was cast for playing Jatayu's character in April 2016. Sailesh Gulabani was cast for playing Vibhishan. Karthik Jayaram was cast for the role of Ravan, making his Hindi television debut. Sara Afreen Khan was cast for playing Ravana's sister Surpanaka who was later replaced by Bhagyashree Mote. Pratima Kazmi was cast as Ravana's mother Kaikesi. In August 2016, Shakti Singh was cast for playing Valmiki. Uzair Basar and Harsha Sharma were cast to play Luv and Kush in September 2016.

Release

On 2 January 2016, a team of Star Plus flagged off Shiv Dhanush Yatra, which was inaugurated with an Aarthi on the banks of Ganga in Kashi Vishwanath Temple following a Pooja at Somnath temple in Gujarat, by traveling across 107 cities across Gujarat, Punjab and Uttar Pradesh in 15 days to promote the series.

Speaking about the series, creative head of Star Plus Anirudh Pathak stated, "We have seen different dimensions of Ramayan. So what was pending? Then we thought that we haven’t heard the Ramayan from Sita’s viewpoint. She’s not different from Ram. She was with him always and that was her choice. She was a warrior herself and her story was out of compassion and not a compulsion. This Ramayan is racy, technologically upgraded as regards shoots, camera, sets, locations, etc. If we aren’t giving them the flavor of 'Game of Thrones' then there was no point in telling the Ramayan once again."

The series was supposed to end in mid October 2016 but received an extension for a month and ended in November 2016.

Filming

The cast of the series was unveiled at Ramoji Film City, Hyderabad where the series was mainly filmed. Besides, it was also filmed in various locations including Sri Lanka, Lepakshi (Andhra Pradesh), Bhuj (Gujarat), Darjeeling (West Bengal), Kerala, Madhya Pradesh, and Mumbai.

For the wedding sequence of Ram and Sita, 100 kg of flowers were used. Owing to rain while shooting outdoors for the war sequence between Lord Ram and Ravana, eight copies of the same costume were arranged by the makers to tackle it.

In April 2016, the vanvas sequence was shot in Virar, Maharashtra. In May 2016, while shooting for Sita's kidnapping by Ravan sequence, Madirakshi Mundle got injured in an accident and the shoot was held for a while.

Critical reception
The Quint reviewed, "Siya Ke Raam presents a refreshing change. The grand scale of production and the elaborate costumes add the required epic-ness to the story. Impressive sets evoke awe, wonder, and magic. The show’s cast is pretty bang on too with Bijay Anand, Dalip Tahil, Grusha Kapoor, and many other talented actors putting together an entertaining drama. The show’s attention to detail, research, and authenticity are also very impressive."

Comparing the role of some actors and actresses who played in earlier versions Ramayan 1987, Ramayan 2008 Hindustan Times stated, "Ashish Sharma was a muscular, powerful Ram with a forever Pokerface. But he did look a lot more like a prince than Arun Govil. The makes of Siya Ke Ram has always maintained that the show is a retelling of the epic from Sita’s perspective which Madirakshi a lot more room to impress. She is not mute or opinionless like Deepika Chiklis’ Sita. Madirakshi was also more expressive without going overboard. Karthik is big too but in a 'gym-jock' way rather than a 'fat-demon' way. Karthik's accent was not popular among the audience as many Hindi words would give him trouble. They did get a voice actor to dub over his words but it was all too evident on screen and a tad irritating. Danish was huge but inspired! And the make up department did him dirty. The great acting from even the secondary characters like Kaikeyi (Grusha Kapoor) and Dasharath (Dalip Tahil) was also enough to keep viewers hooked." However, reviewing the sets, costumes, and CGI, they said, "In Siya Ke Ram, the computer graphics helped give an appearance of grandeur. The attention to detail and the costumes were beautiful as well. The lamps behind the actors, the divan, the beautiful artwork, and the coloring sheets. Everything was just right for a king’s room. Sure the CGI did go a bit awry from time to time."

Awards

References

External links
 
 

StarPlus original programming
2015 Indian television series debuts
2016 Indian television series endings
Television series based on the Ramayana